Till The Clouds Roll By is a 1946 American Technicolor musical film produced by Metro-Goldwyn-Mayer. A fictionalized biopic of composer Jerome Kern, portrayed by Robert Walker, Kern was originally involved with the production, but died before its completion. Featuring an ensemble cast of well-known musical stars, it was the first in a series of MGM biopics about Broadway composers.

The film is one of the MGM musicals that entered the public domain when MGM failed to renew their copyrights.

Plot
Kern attends the opening night of Show Boat in 1927, the landmark musical that secured his popularity. Following several of the show's most notable songs, Kern departs to reminisce about his early days as a young songwriter. 

Kern recounts meeting Jim Hessler, a musical mentor, and Hessler's young daughter Sally. Kern and the Hesslers grow close, and he later visits them in London. Taking Sally to the fair, a swing ride inspires Kern to conceive a stage production for one of his songs. At the London Gaieties revue, Kern's song garners the attention of theatrical producer Charles Frohman. 

When Kern happens to meet Eva Leale, it's love at first sight, but the courtship is cut short. He must abruptly sail back to New York to adapt The Girl from Utah for its Broadway debut. Following the show's success, Kern narrowly misses sailing back to London on the RMS Lusitania. 

The 1917 opening night of Oh, Boy! includes the musical number "Till the Clouds Roll By". The composer proposes to Eva, and returns to New York to continue his string of theatrical successes, including Leave It to Jane. His 1920 musical Sally, starring Marilyn Miller, popularized the song "Look for the Silver Lining".

Now grown up, Sally Hessler asks her "Uncle Jerry" to help her get a stage role. He writes the song "Who?" for her to have a part in the 1925 musical Sunny. After the show's producers  give the song to star Marilyn Miller, Sally leaves in protest. At the opening night of Sunny, Kern learns that Sally has run off, leaving her father despondent. 

All attempts to locate Sally fail, and Jim Hessler dies, leaving a mourning Kern unable to work. Oscar Hammerstein visits the Kerns to share a copy of the 1926 novel Show Boat. The same night, Kern learns that Sally will be performing at a club in Memphis. He leaves to find her in Tennessee, where the two make amends, and he spends the night listening to the sounds of the mighty Mississippi River. 

Having recounted his life story so far, Kern feels his career has likely come to an end with Show Boat. On the contrary, he continued to write hit shows, including The Cat and the Fiddle (1931) and Roberta (1933). While visiting a sound stage at MGM, Kern is delighted to discover the studio has cast Sally to perform in a new film featuring his songs.

Highlights of Kern's Hollywood career include songs from Swing Time (1936), Cover Girl (1944), and Broadway Rhythm (1944); the montage concludes with songs from Sweet Adeline and Show Boat.

Cast

 Robert Walker as Jerome Kern
 June Allyson as herself/Jane in Leave It to Jane 
 Lucille Bremer as Sally Hessler
 Judy Garland as Marilyn Miller
 Kathryn Grayson as Magnolia Hawks in Show Boat/Herself
 Van Heflin as James I. Hessler
 Lena Horne as Julie LaVerne in Show Boat/Herself
 Dorothy Patrick as Eva Kern
 Van Johnson as bandleader in Elite Club
 Tony Martin as Gaylord Ravenal in Show Boat/Himself 
 Dinah Shore as Julia Sanderson
 Frank Sinatra as himself 
 Gower Champion as Specialty dancer in Roberta
 Cyd Charisse as Specialty dancer in Roberta
 Angela Lansbury as London specialty
 Ray McDonald as Dance Specialty in Oh, Boy! and Leave It to Jane
 Virginia O'Brien as Ellie Mae in Show Boat/Herself
 Mary Nash as Mrs. Muller
 Joan Wells as Young Sally Hessler
 Harry Hayden as Charles Frohman
 Paul Langton as Oscar Hammerstein II
 Paul Maxey as Victor Herbert

Cast notes
 Esther Williams makes a cameo appearance
 Sally Forrest and Mary Hatcher make appearances as "chorus girls".
 Kathryn Grayson reprised the role of Magnolia Hawks in MGM's film adaptation of Show Boat, released in 1951.

Production

The working title for the film was "As the Clouds Roll By".  Gene Kelly was originally intended to play Kern, with Gloria DeHaven, Jacqueline White, Imogen Carpenter, a stage actress, and Jeanette MacDonald in major parts. None appeared in the film.

The first 15 minutes of the film consist of a condensed adaptation of Act I of Show Boat, with the order of some of the songs shifted - "Can't Help Lovin' Dat Man" is sung after "Life upon the Wicked Stage", and "Ol' Man River" was used as an Act I Finale, dissimilar to the show. "Can't Help Lovin' Dat Man" as sung by Lena Horne was filmed, like many of her other musical numbers in MGM films, so that it could be easily removed from the print by sensitive Southern distributors.

When the film started production in the fall of 1945, Judy Garland was signed as Broadway singer-dancer Marilyn Miller, having just returned to California after a long New York honeymoon with her new husband, director Vincente Minnelli.  Soon after, Kern returned to New York towards the end of October and died in November 1945.

During the six months that it took to shoot the film, producer Arthur Freed had to come up with one director after another. Lemuel Ayers, a set designer, was originally scheduled to make his directorial debut on the film, but was replaced by Busby Berkeley late in August 1945. Meanwhile, Minnelli – who, it was rumored at the time, would be taking over the direction of the film – was shooting Garland's sequences even before the beginning of principal photography, as she was pregnant and expected to give birth in March 1946; her shooting was completed on November 8, 1945. By the time full shooting began in the middle of December, Berkeley had been replaced by Henry Koster, who was also replaced after a short period by Richard Whorf. Whorf ended up receiving the onscreen directorial credit. There was a break in production from some time in January 1946 to the middle of March of that year.

The film includes two versions of "Ol' Man River" - the first sung by Caleb Peterson and an African-American chorus as part of the Show Boat medley, and the second, a "crooner version" by Frank Sinatra, featured as the grand finale.

Barbette consulted on the creation of the film's circus sequence.

Songs

 "Cotton Blossom" - MGM Studio Orchestra and Chorus
 "Where's the Mate for Me" - Tony Martin
 "Make Believe" - Kathryn Grayson/Tony Martin
 "Life Upon the Wicked Stage" - Virginia O'Brien/MGM Studio Orchestra and Chorus Girls
 "Can't Help Lovin' Dat Man" - Lena Horne
 "Ol' Man River" - Caleb Peterson/MGM Studio Orchestra and Chorus
 "Ka-Lu-a" - MGM Studio Orchestra
 "How'd You Like to Spoon with Me" - Angela Lansbury/MGM Studio Orchestra and Chorus
 "They Didn't Believe Me" - Dinah Shore
 "Till the Clouds Roll By" - June Allyson/Ray McDonald/MGM Studio Orchestra and Chorus
 "Leave It to Jane" - MGM Studio Orchestra and Chorus/June Allyson/Ray McDonald
 "Cleopatterer" - June Allyson/Ray McDonald/MGM Studio Orchestra and Chorus
 "Leave It to Jane" (Reprise) - MGM Studio Orchestra and Chorus/June Allyson/Ray McDonald
 "Look for the Silver Lining" - Judy Garland
 "Sunny" - Judy Garland/MGM Studio Orchestra and Chorus
 "Who?" - Judy Garland/MGM Studio Orchestra and Chorus
 "One More Dance" - Lucille Bremer (Dubbed by Trudy Erwin)
 "I Won't Dance" - Van Johnson/Lucille Bremer (dubbed by Trudy Erwin)
 "She Didn't Say Yes" - Lee and Lyn Wilde, aka "The Wilde Twins"
 "Smoke Gets in Your Eyes" - Cyd Charisse/Gower Champion
 "The Last Time I Saw Paris" - Dinah Shore
 "The Land Where the Good Songs Go" - Lucille Bremer (dubbed by Trudy Erwin)
 "Yesterdays" - MGM Studio Orchestra and Chorus
 "Long Ago (and Far Away)" - Kathryn Grayson
 "A Fine Romance" - Virginia O'Brien
 "All the Things You Are" - Tony Martin
 "Why Was I Born?" - Lena Horne
 "Ol' Man River" (Reprise/Finale) - Frank Sinatra/MGM Studio Orchestra and Chorus

Surviving Judy Garland outtake
A video of an excised musical number survives from this film, although part of the soundtrack has been lost. Judy Garland, as Marilyn Miller, sings "D'Ya Love Me?" to two clowns in a circus setting, representing a scene from the Broadway musical Sunny.

Soundtrack album

The film was one of the first motion pictures to have a soundtrack album released concurrent with it arriving in theaters. The soundtrack was produced by MGM Records, originally released as four 78-rpm records featuring various artists and songs from the film and cover artwork by Lennie Hayton. The album was later released on LP.

No official authorized version has yet been released on CD, but several unauthorized versions have appeared on the market. Rhino Entertainment currently owns the rights to issue an authorized CD of the soundtrack, under license from Turner Entertainment; in the past, MCA Records and Sony Music Entertainment held such rights.

Reception

Critical response
Bosley Crowther, reviewing the film for The New York Times, wrote:
"Why did Metro...have to cook up a thoroughly phoney yarn about the struggles of a chirpy young composer to carry the lovely songs of Jerry Kern? And why did it have to do it in such a hackneyed and sentimental way as to grate on the sensibilities of even the most affectionately disposed?"

Variety began its review with a similar sentiment: "Why quibble about the story?" In a retrospective review, American film critic Pauline Kael commented, "This monster thing, spawned at M-G-M, was meant to be the life of Jerome Kern."

Box office
The film earned $4,748,000 in the US and Canada box office and $1,976,000 elsewhere, but because of its high cost the profit was only $732,000.

Accolades
The film is recognized by American Film Institute in these lists:
 2006: AFI's Greatest Movie Musicals – Nominated

Home media
The film is one of several MGM musicals – another being Royal Wedding – that entered the public domain 28 years after production because the studio did not renew the copyright registration. As such, it is one of the most widely circulated MGM musicals on home video. Warner Home Video gave it its first fully restored DVD release on April 25, 2006.

Related films
Till The Clouds Roll By was the first in a series of MGM biopics about Broadway composers: it was followed by Words and Music about Rodgers and Hart in 1948, Three Little Words about Kalmar and Ruby in 1950, and Deep in My Heart about Sigmund Romberg in 1954.

References

External links

 "Till The Clouds Roll By" Full movie at BuggZugg YouTube
 
 
  (100%)
 
 
 
 "Till The Clouds Roll By" at TheJudyRoom.com

1946 films
1940s biographical films
1946 musical films
American biographical films
American musical films
1940s English-language films
Films about composers
Films about musical theatre
Films directed by Richard Whorf
Films produced by Arthur Freed
Films scored by Lennie Hayton
Jukebox musical films
Metro-Goldwyn-Mayer films
1940s American films